The 2011–12 season will be Ferencvárosi TC's 109th competitive season, 3rd consecutive season in the OTP Bank Liga and 112th year in existence as a football club.

First team squad

Transfers

Summer

In:

Out:

Winter

In:

Out:

List of Hungarian football transfer summer 2011
List of Hungarian football transfers winter 2011–12

Statistics

Appearances and goals
Last updated on 27 May 2012.

|-
|colspan="14"|Players currently out on loan

|-
|colspan="14"|Youth players

|-
|colspan="14"|Players no longer at the club

|}

Top scorers
Includes all competitive matches. The list is sorted by shirt number when total goals are equal.

Last updated on 27 May 2012

Disciplinary record
Includes all competitive matches. Players with 1 card or more included only.

Last updated on 27 May 2012

Overall
{|class="wikitable"
|-
|Games played || 43 (30 OTP Bank Liga, 4 UEFA Europa League, 3 Hungarian Cup and 6 Hungarian League Cup)
|-
|Games won || 13 (9 OTP Bank Liga, 3 UEFA Europa League, 1 Hungarian Cup and 0 Hungarian League Cup)
|-
|Games drawn || 10 (7 OTP Bank Liga, 0 UEFA Europa League, 2 Hungarian Cup and 1 Hungarian League Cup)
|-
|Games lost || 20 (14 OTP Bank Liga, 1 UEFA Europa League, 0 Hungarian Cup and 5 Hungarian League Cup)
|-
|Goals scored || 52
|-
|Goals conceded || 57
|-
|Goal difference || -5
|-
|Yellow cards || 92
|-
|Red cards || 8
|-
|rowspan="1"|Worst discipline ||  Tamás Grúz (9 , 1 )
|-
|rowspan="3"|Best result || 3–0 (H) v Ulisses - UEFA Europa League - 30-06-2011
|-
| 3–0 (H) v Újpest FC - OTP Bank Liga - 22-10-2011
|-
| 5–2 (A) v Szolnoki MÁV FC - Hungarian Cup - 26-10-2011
|-
|rowspan="1"|Worst result || 1–4 (H) v Pécsi Mecsek FC - Hungarian League Cup - 07-09-2011
|-
|rowspan="1"|Most appearances ||  Júnior (33 appearances)
|-
|rowspan="1"|Top scorer ||  Péter Pölöskey (7 goals)
|-
|Points || 49/129 (37.99%)
|-

Nemzeti Bajnokság I

Matches

Classification

Results summary

Results by round

Hungarian Cup

Round of 16

League Cup

Matches

Classification

Europa League

The First and Second Qualifying Round draws took place at UEFA headquarters in Nyon, Switzerland on 20 June 2011.

Pre Season (Winter)

References

External links
 Eufo
 Official Website
 UEFA
 fixtures and results

2011-12
Hungarian football clubs 2011–12 season
Ferencvaros